Scott Aaron Weight (born 3 April 1987) is an English semi-professional footballer. He began his career at Brentford, for whom he made one professional appearance before dropping into non-League football upon his release in 2005. Weight joined Ashford Town (Middlesex) in 2006, held the captaincy and was one of the club's longest serving players before his departure in 2014. He had a second spell for the club between 2015 and 2020. Weight is described as a "tough tackling midfield player who can also revert to central defender as and when needed".

Playing career

Brentford 
Weight began his career as a youth at Brentford and joined the club's Centre Of Excellence at the age of 10. His maiden call into the first team squad came for a Football League Trophy first round match against Milton Keynes Dons on 28 September 2004. He made his professional debut in the match, coming on as a substitute for Ryan Peters after 82 minutes of the 3–0 defeat. It was Weight's only involvement for the first team and he was released at the end of the 2004–05 season.

Hampton & Richmond Borough 
Weight signed for Isthmian League Premier Division club Hampton & Richmond Borough during the 2005 off-season. He made only one league appearance for the club, coming on as an injury time substitute for Francis Quarm in a 2–0 win over Hendon on 27 August.

Ashford Town (Middlesex) 
Weight joined Southern League First Division West club Ashford Town (Middlesex) midway through the 2005–06 season and made four league appearances in February 2006. Following promotion to the Isthmian League Premier Division, Weight made 12 appearances during the 2006–07 season and helped the Tangerines win the Isthmian League Cup. He made 24 appearances and scored one goal during the 2007–08 season. Weight made only 12 appearances during the 2008–09 season, but won the Surrey Senior Cup with the team.

Weight made 35 appearances and was the 2009–10 Ashford Town Player Of Year, but the season ended on a sour note after the Tangerines suffered relegation to the Southern League First Division Central. He made sporadic appearances during the 2010–11 and 2011–12 seasons, due to work commitments, but won the Aldershot Senior Cup with the team. Weight was fully available during the 2012–13 season, making 39 appearances and scoring 2 goals. In a poor 2013–14 season (which saw the Tangerines relegated to the Combined Counties League Premier Division with a bottom-place finish), he won the Players' Player Of The Year award. Weight departed the club after the season.

Egham Town 
Weight joined Southern League First Division Central club Egham Town during the 2014 off-season. He made just seven appearances during the opening month of the 2014–15 season, before suffering a broken ankle during a 1–0 defeat to Abingdon United on 30 August 2014.

Return to Ashford Town (Middlesex) 
In July 2015, Weight returned to Combined Counties League Premier Division club Ashford Town (Middlesex) and made 32 appearances during the promotion-winning 2015–16 season. He played on through the 2016–17 and 2017–18 Southern League First Division seasons and as of September 2017, had made over 200 league appearances for the club. In May 2019, Weight was named as player-assistant to new manager Russell Canderton and he made 31 appearances during the abandoned 2019–20 season, which was his last with the club.

Bedfont Sports 
Weight began the 2020–21 season with Isthmian League South Central Division club Bedfont Sports. As a result of the 2020–21 Isthmian League season being declared null and void in February 2021, Weight finished the campaign with six appearances and one goal.

Sunday league football 
Weight made appearances for Chiswick & District Sunday League Veterans Premier Division club Shire United Veterans First during the 2021–22 season.

Honours 
Ashford Town (Middlesex)
Combined Counties League Premier Division second-place promotion: 2015–16
Isthmian League Cup: 2006–07
 Surrey Senior Cup: 2008–09
 Aldershot Senior Cup: 2011–12

Individual

 Ashford Town (Middlesex) Player Of The Year: 2009–10
 Ashford Town (Middlesex) Players' Player Of The Year: 2013–14

Career statistics

References

External links

1987 births
Living people
English footballers
Association football midfielders
Brentford F.C. players
Hampton & Richmond Borough F.C. players
Ashford Town (Middlesex) F.C. players
Footballers from Hammersmith
Isthmian League players
Southern Football League players
Egham Town F.C. players
Association football central defenders
Bedfont Sports F.C. players